Lee J. Alston (born March 29, 1951) is the Ostrom Chair, Professor of Economics and Law, and Director of the Ostrom Workshop at Indiana University.  He is also a research associate at the National Bureau of Economic Research. On August 6, 2014, Alston was appointed director of the Vincent and Elinor Ostrom Workshop in Political Theory and Policy Analysis at Indiana University, Bloomington, from which he received his B.A. in 1973.
His research has focused on institutions and contracts and their role in influencing rural land use in the US and Brazil.
In 2012 Alston was awarded a Clio Can award by the Cliometric Society for Exceptional Support to the Field of Cliometrics.

Selected publications 
 Alston, Lee J., and Gary D. Libecap. (1996) "The determinants and impact of property rights: land titles on the Brazilian frontier." Journal of Law, Economics, and Organization 12.1 pp25–61.
 Alston, Lee J., Gary D. Libecap, and Bernardo Mueller. (1999) Conflict, and Land Use: The Development of Property Rights and Land Reform on the Brazilian Amazon Frontier. University of Michigan Press

References 

1951 births
Living people
Economic historians
Indiana University faculty
Economists from Wisconsin
People from Port Washington, Wisconsin
21st-century American economists
Presidents of the Economic History Association